The 1998 Welwyn Hatfield District Council election took place on 7 May 1998 to elect members of Welwyn Hatfield District Council in Hertfordshire, England. One third of the council was up for election and the Labour party stayed in overall control of the council.

After the election, the composition of the council was
Labour 27
Conservative 20

Election result

References

1998
1998 English local elections
1990s in Hertfordshire